Landbo is a neighborhood of Helsinki, Finland.

Neighbourhoods of Helsinki